Heart On is the third studio album from American rock band Eagles of Death Metal, released on October 28, 2008.

When asked about the album, lead singer Jesse Hughes stated: "EODM's latest fabulous weapon, a top-secret music missile, a sonic warhead sexually tipped for her pleasure, shot from the deck of USS EODM Mantastic Fantastic." The album was mastered at Bernie Grundman Mastering by Brian Gardner. On September 12, 2008, Pitchfork Media released new information on Heart On, including the album cover and track list.

The first single was "Wannabe in LA". The video for the song debuted on the band's MySpace and depicts Jesse Hughes appearing on a Pin Art in a similar style to the music video for Nine Inch Nails' "Only". There is an alternative version of the video; dubbed the "standard version", which only features Jesse Hughes. The video was directed by Liam Lynch.

On October 21, the album was made available in its entirety for streaming on MuchMusic website.

Commercial performance
The album debuted at No. 57 on the Billboard 200, and No. 21 on the Top Rock Albums chart, selling around 10,000 copies in its first week of release.  The album has sold 50,000 copies in the United States as of September 2015.

Track listing
All songs written by Jesse Hughes and Josh Homme.

Personnel
 Boots Electric – lead vocals, rhythm guitar, lead guitar, percussion, talkbox (track 3), bass (tracks 4 & 8), acoustic guitar (track 6)
 Baby Duck – drums, bass, lead licks, backing vocals, rhythm guitar, percussion, piano,  slide bass (track 2), keyboards (track 4), Casio (track 5), acoustic guitar (track 7), slide guitar (tracks 7–9, 12), vibraslap (track 7)
 Dave Catching – rhythm guitar (tracks 3, 10), lead guitar (track 6), guitar solo (track 8), bass (track 12)
 Brian O'Connor – Bass (tracks 3, 5, 7, 10)
 Troy Van Leeuwen – backing vocals (track 4)
 C-Minus – Clapping (track 4), the beat (track 9)
 Alain Johannes – backing vocals (track 4), horns (track 10)
 Tony Bevilacqua – horns (track 10)
 Additional backing vocals by: Carol Hatchett, Kira Dacosta, Brody "Queen Bee" Dalle, Kim "Koko Bubbles" Martinelli, Kat Von D. and Erin Smith

Notes
 "Anything 'Cept the Truth" is the final version of the track "Ask Me Why", which was leaked when a source close to the band had their MySpace hacked.
 "Anything 'Cept the Truth" has been used in promotions for the Fox television network show Lie To Me, commercials to support the USA Network show Burn Notice, and featured in NHL 10 and Need for Speed: Shift.
 The song "Wannabe in L.A." is featured in the video game Midnight Club: Los Angeles which was released seven days before the song was released, and it can also be heard in the video games MLB 09: The Show, Colin McRae: Dirt 2, and is a playable selection in Guitar Hero 5. 
 The song "Now I'm a Fool" has striking resemblances in the music and lyrics to Steely Dan's "Only A Fool Would Say That" from 1972's Can't Buy A Thrill. 
 The lyric "I never smile when I tell a lie" from "Anything 'Cept the Truth" is a reference to the Hall & Oates "Kiss On My List" lyric that goes "I only smile when I lie."
 The song "Wannabe in L.A." was featured in the opening credit of the thriller The Perfect Host in 2010.
 The song "Wannabe in L.A." was used in the finale episode of the first season of the Epix show Get Shorty

Charts

References

2008 albums
Eagles of Death Metal albums
Albums produced by Josh Homme
Downtown Records albums